The Teatro Nuovo (New Theater) is a theater in Milan, located on the Piazza San Babila in the lower level of the . The theater, designed by architect , was the project of the impresario Remigio Paone. It was inaugurated on 22 December 1938 with a performance of Eduardo De Filippo's comedy Ditegli sempre di sì.

Although its repertoire is largely devoted to theatre, musicals, and revues, it has also hosted opera performances. Opera singers and conductors who have made their professional debuts there include Riccardo Chailly (Werther, 1970) and Piero Cappuccilli (Pagliacci, 1957).

References

External links

 (it)

Theatres in Milan